Prince Talal bin Muhammad (born 26 July 1965) is a member of the Jordanian royal family. He is the eldest son of Prince Muhammad bin Talal, the younger brother of King Hussein of Jordan, and first cousin of the current King Abdullah; this makes him 15th in the line of succession to the Jordanian throne. He has one brother, Prince Ghazi (b. 1966).

Biography

Prince Talal's early education took place in Jordan, and from 1975 to 1983 he attended Harrow School in the United Kingdom. In September 1983 he entered the Royal Military Academy Sandhurst in the United Kingdom, and upon passing in April 1984 was commissioned as a 2nd Lieutenant in the Jordan Arab Army. After a few months in the Jordanian Army, he entered the School of Foreign Service of Georgetown University, Washington DC in September 1984. He completed the five-year joint degree Bachelor of Science in Foreign Service – Master of Science in Foreign Service (BSFS-MSFS) program, concentrating in International Politics for his BS Degree and US Foreign Policy and Diplomacy for his MS Degree.

After undergoing further military training the US and the UK, Talal returned to the Jordanian Armed Forces, where he served as a Company Commander in a Special Forces battalion from March 1990 until March 1991. On 25 March 1991, he was appointed as Military Secretary to King Hussein. In this capacity he functioned as a personal aide to the King, taking the minutes of his meetings and accompanying him daily on his activities within Jordan and his official trips abroad. These duties expanded to charge of the King's political correspondence and speech writing – Prince Talal co-authored King Hussein's speech before a Joint Session of the US Congress marking the end of a State of War between Jordan and Israel in July 1994. Talal was further entrusted by King Hussein with intelligence liaison activities and confidential political missions.

In addition to this, Prince Talal was appointed by King Hussein as his Personal Representative in the United States in February 1992 – a position he held until the death of King Hussein in February 1999. This involved enhancing relations with the US Administration, Government and Congress following the Gulf War of 1991. Talal also advanced the King's official trips to the US, arranging his program and topics of discussion with US officials. He would then prepare his talking points, and remain behind in the US after each visit to follow up any outstanding issues. He was closely involved in securing the forgiveness of Jordan's $700 million debt to the US and the transfer of a squadron of F-16 fighter aircraft from the US to Jordan following the Washington Declaration of July 1994.

In August 1996, Prince Talal was appointed by King Hussein as Director of the National Security Council, with the task of establishing the National Security Council of Jordan. Amongst other things, he was responsible for the recruitment, training, and organization of the NSC Staff; the compilation of electronic data bases and Intelnet setup; coordination with the relevant government officials and bodies; intelligence liaison; producing and distributing a daily brief and in-depth studies; and compiling the Agenda for NSC meetings. Following the death of King Hussein, Prince Talal continued to hold this post until August 1999, when King Abdullah II appointed him as his National Security Advisor. He held this post until September 2001 when he was appointed Special Advisor to King Abdullah II.

Personal life
In 1991, Prince Talal married Ghida Salaam, daughter of Hany Sala'am and Raja'a Arab. The couple live in Jordan with their three children: Prince Hussein (born 1999) and twins Princess Raja'a and Prince Muhammad (born 2001).

Education

1975–1983  
The Harrow School in Harrow, London, England.
  
1983–1984	
The Royal Military Academy Sandhurst, UK. (Standard Military Course No.34)

1984–1989
Edmund A. Walsh School of Foreign Service,  
Washington DC, USA. Five-year Bachelor of     
Science in Foreign Service-Master of Science in   
Foreign Service Joint Degree program
BSFS Concentration: International Politics, Law and Organization. MSFS Concentration: US Foreign Policy and Diplomacy
 
1975–1978	
St Edmund's School, UK

1973–1975	
American Community School, Amman

1972–1973	
Orthodox College, Amman

Career

Sept. 2001 – present
Special Advisor to King Abdullah II
Aug.1999-Sept.2001
National Security Advisor to King Abdullah II and Director of the National Security Council
Aug.1996-Aug.1999
Director of the National Security Council
Feb.1992-Feb.1999
Personal Representative of King Hussein in the United States of America
Mar.1991-Aug.1996
Military Secretary of King Hussein
Mar.1990-Mar.1991
Officer Commanding, 2nd Company, 91st SpecialForces Battalion, Khaw, Jordan
Aug.1984-Mar.1990
Special Forces Brigade Headquarters
May–Aug. 1984
Deputy A-Team Leader, 1st Company, 101st Special Forces Battalion, Hashemiyyah, Jordan

Other activities
 Sept. 2008 – present
Advisory Board Member, The James Martin 21st century School, Oxford University, UK
 Feb.2001– March 2002
Chairman of the National Landmine Removal and Rehabilitation Commission, Jordan
 Sept.1997 – present
Member of the Higher Committee of the Retired Servicemen and Veterans Association, Jordan
 Sept.1998-Sept.2001
Chairman of the Board of Trustees, Mu’tah University, Kerak, Jordan
 Sept.1998-Sept.2001
Member of the Committee of Higher Education, Jordan

Honours

National honours
  : Grand Cordon of the Order of the Star of Jordan 
  : Grand Cordon of the Order of Independence

Foreign honours
  : Knight Grand Cross of the Royal Norwegian Order of Merit (4.4.2000) 
  : Knight Grand Cross of the Royal Order of Isabella the Catholic (2.12.1994)
  : Commander Grand Cross of the Order of the Polar Star (15.11.2022)

Appointments

Military promotions
June 2009 Major-General
June 2002 Brigadier-General
May 1997 Colonel
June 1994 Lieutenant-Colonel
Nov.1992 Major
Nov.1989 Captain
Nov.1986 1st Lieutenant
Apr. 1984 Commissioned 2nd Lieutenant

References

|-

House of Hashim
Jordanian Muslims
Jordanian princes
Living people
People from Amman
1965 births
People educated at Harrow School
Graduates of the Royal Military Academy Sandhurst
Walsh School of Foreign Service alumni
Jordanian generals

Grand Cordons of the Order of Independence (Jordan)
Knights Grand Cross of the Order of Isabella the Catholic